The 111th Mahars was an infantry regiment of the British Indian Army that formed part of the Indian Army during the First World War.  Raised in June 1917, it was disbanded in 1922.

History
The 111th Mahars was raised on 19 June 1917 at Mhow. It served with the 5th (Mhow) Division until October when it transferred to the Secunderabad Brigade, 9th (Secunderabad) Division. In March 1918, it moved to Bombay Brigade, 6th Poona Divisional Area until December 1918 when it transferred to Jubbulpore Brigade back in 5th (Mhow) Division. They served on the North West Frontier for six-month in 1920 and then in Aden.

In 1919, the regiment absorbed the 71st Punjabis, but was itself was disbanded in 1922. A new Mahar Regiment was raised in October 1941 which continues to serve in the Indian Army.

See also

 71st Punjabis
 Mahar Regiment

References

Bibliography

External links
 

British Indian Army infantry regiments
Military units and formations established in 1917
Military units and formations disestablished in 1922